The Austin marque started with the Austin Motor Company, and survived a merger with the Nuffield Organization to form the British Motor Corporation, incorporation into the British Leyland Motor Corporation, nationalisation as British Leyland (BL) forming part of its volume car division Austin Morris later Austin Rover, and later privatisation as part of the Rover Group and was finally phased out as a brand in 1989.

Model listing
Models are placed according to which era they were first produced, some models carried over between eras of the marque.

Pre World War I
data source

Post World War I

Post World War II

BMC era
1952 onwards

British Leyland (BL)
(Austin Morris, Leyland Cars, Austin Morris (reformed))
1967–1982

BL / Rover Group
(Austin Rover)
1982 to 1988

Commercial vehicles

London Taxicabs
Complying with London Metropolitan Police Area (and Heathrow) regulationsalso non-compliant hire car variants.

Car-based commercials
Austin 6cwt/8cwt (re-badged Morris Minor) 1953–1971
Austin A30 van 1954–1956
Austin A35 van 1956–1968
Austin A55 and A60 van 1958–1972
Austin A40 van and pick-up
Austin Mini van 1960–1982 and pick-up 1961–1982
Austin 1800 Utility (Australia only) 1968–1971
Austin Metro van 1982–1990 
Austin Maestro van 1985–1994

Light commercials

Austin K8 "Three Way" 1947–1954
Austin LD 1954-1967
Austin 152/J2 1956-1967
Austin 101 1957–1961 "badge engineered" version of Morris JB
Austin J4 1960-1968
Austin Morris 250 JU 1967-1974
Austin Morris EA 1968-1984

Lorries
 Austin 2 ton (1913)
 Austin 702 7 ton
 Austin K4 Loadstar 1949-56
 Austin 301 (rebadged Morris Commercial LC5) 1953-57
 Austin WE 303/304, 403, 503 (1955–64)
 Austin WF (1964–68)
 Austin FG (also sold as 404 and S200) 1960-
 Austin FV Series II
 Austin FE Series III
 Austin FF (also sold as Austin 45 and Morris FF) 1958-61
 Austin FH (1961–64)
 Austin FJ (1964–68)

Military
Austin K2/Y 1939-1945 Ambulance
Austin K3 1939-1945 3-ton
Austin K4 Tanker, Dropside, Fire 
Austin K5 1941-1945
Austin K6 1942-1945
Austin Champ 1947–56
Austin K9 1952-1955

References

 Austin Memories—History of Austin and Longbridge

Austin
 
Austin Motor Company